Stephen Shaw may refer to:

Stephen Shaw (ombudsman) (born 1953), prisons and probation ombudsman in the UK
Stephen William Shaw (1817–1900), California pioneer artist
Steve Shaw (tennis) (born 1963), British professional tennis player

See also
Steven Shaw (disambiguation)
Stephen Shore (born 1947), American photographer
Stephen Shore (professor) (born 1961), professor of special education at Adelphi University